Aifili Paulo Lauvao (December 24, 1919 – August 1, 2002), was twice governor of American Samoa (1985–1989, 1993–1997). The founder of the U.S territory's Democratic Party, he had a long career in the legislature and the judiciary in American Samoa.

Governor Lutali was a preservationist who wanted to preserve large areas of the territory's nature. Lutali also worked to preserve American Samoa's ancient sites and historical buildings. He revitalized the Historic Preservation Office.

Biography

Education
From 1951 to 1954, Lutali served as administrative supervisor for public schools. He was chairman of the Samoan Culture Curriculum Committee from 1952 to 1954, a member of the Board of Education from 1955 to 1958, and chairman of the first American Samoa Board of Higher Education, which established the American Samoa Community College, Mapusaga, in 1974. He was admitted to practice in the High Court of American Samoa in 1954 and was one of the founders of the American Samoa Bar Association in 1972. He was appointed a permanent judge of the high court in 1972, and later as chief judge of the Lands and Titles Division.

Political career
Lutali was elected to the American Samoa House of Representatives in 1955 and served as its speaker in 1955–58. He was a member of the 1966 Constitutional Convention and was American Samoa's Delegate to Congress from 1975 to 1979. He was elected to the American Samoa Senate in 1977 and was elected its president in his first year, serving in the senate concurrent to his four-year term as delegate. He ran unsuccessfully for Governor in the 1977 American Samoan gubernatorial election, losing to Peter Tali Coleman. In 1978 he announced he would not seek another term as delegate.

He was first elected governor of American Samoa in 1984 and lost his bid for a second term in 1988. In 1989, he was returned by his district (Sa'ole) to the Senate where he served as chairman of the Committee on Government Operations until he was again elected governor in 1992. Lutali played a key role in working with Samoan chiefs and the U.S. Congress to create the 50th national park of the United States in American Samoa. He lost his bid for a third term as governor in the 1996 elections.

Death
Lutali suffered a stroke and was admitted to LBJ Medical Center. He died on August 1, 2002.

Legacy
The A. P. Lutali Elementary School on the island of Aunu'u is named in his honor. The A P Lutali Executive Office Building in Utulei is also named after him.

Sources
 Rulers.org

References

|-

|-

|-

1919 births
2002 deaths
20th-century American politicians
American people of Samoan descent
American Samoa Democrats
American Samoa Senators
Delegates to the United States House of Representatives from American Samoa
Democratic Party members of the United States House of Representatives from American Samoa
Democratic Party governors of American Samoa
Governors of American Samoa
Members of the American Samoa House of Representatives
Speakers of the American Samoa House of Representatives